Godus is a god video game developed by the independent company 22cans and published by DeNA. Godus was designed by Peter Molyneux, who described it as the spiritual successor to his earlier creation, Populous. While the mobile versions of the game continue to be updated, the early access Steam release has yet to see an updated beta since 2016. The contract of the lead developer of the game, Konrad Naszynski, expired 28 June 2016, and it has been reported that there is no one left working on the PC version. As of March 2023, almost 8 years after the last update on the PC version, the game is still being advertised as early access.

Gameplay 
The player starts out by saving a man and a woman from drowning. Once the player leads them to the Promised Land, they will settle down and build a tent. They will breed a worker, who will build another tent to live in. By using this strategy, the player will explore the world and improve the population through the ages. The main feature of this game is that the player is able to redesign the land levels at will. Different levels need more "Belief" than usual. The player will be able to explore at least one other world after finding a certain ship and gathering enough resources to repair it. The player will need to build more housing dwellings, which increases the population that worships the player. As the population grows, the player will be rewarded with cards that will give access to more powers and grant new abilities and behaviours to the population as well.

Development 
Godus was the effort of game designer Peter Molyneux and his development studio 22cans. The game is the spiritual successor to Molyneux's earlier creation, Populous, and is inspired by his other titles: Dungeon Keeper and Black & White. Molyneux left his position at Microsoft in March 2012 to found 22cans. With a staff of 20 people, the studio released its first game, Curiosity – What's Inside the Cube?, on 6 November 2012, and began working on Godus.

Although the game was only funded two days before the campaign ended, any remaining pledges would be put towards stretch goals which would add features to the game such as more single-player modes, a cooperative mode, and adding support for Linux and the Ouya platform. 22cans planned to release a prototype of the game on 13 December 2012, in an effort to attract more backers to the campaign. At the close of the campaign,  was raised and five out of the six stretch goals were reached, failing to achieve the goal for Ouya support. As of 21 December 2012, Molyneux had not set a release date for the game. As of 13 September 2013, Godus was released on Steam early access as a beta version.

A freemium iOS version of the game was released 7 August 2014, and the Android version was released on 27 November 2014.

With the end of Molyneux's social experiment, Curiosity – What's Inside the Cube?, it was revealed that in Godus a single person will reign as the virtual god over all other players. It was also revealed that this same player will receive a portion of the revenue made by the game. As of February 2015, the winner Bryan Henderson has still not received the prize. In March 2017, Molyneux claimed that Godus had not made a profit and Henderson would not receive money.

In February 2015, 22cans switched focus to another title The Trail, and the remaining Godus development team acknowledged that they “simply can’t see us delivering all the features promised on the KickStarter page.”  Due to Molyneux's apparent abandonment of the project, contrary to his earlier enthusiasm, many fans requested refunds. Furthermore, fans frequently cite "disgraceful treatment" and blatant lying in association with Godus, and by extension Molyneux.

In February 2016, 22cans released a new game, titled Godus Wars, adding in a combat-focused real-time strategy mode, but the original Godus game is still a standalone world separate from the new game. Both are still advertised as early access.

The most recent update to Godus was 2 April 2015  and the last communication with 22Cans regarding the game and its Steam community was 13 May 2016.  Despite many years without update or communication with 22Cans, the game is available for purchase as an early access title on Steam.

In a December 2021 interview, Molyneux stated that "we are announcing our first new set of features for Godus in almost two years and that should be coming out before Christmas." It was not released before or after the Christmas timeframe, and nothing has been heard about the update since the interview.

Reception 

Eurogamer's Tom Bramwell expressed concern that successful game designers were funding their projects using Kickstarter, stating: "I'm looking at Kickstarter through the prism of Molyneux and Braben and Schafer and Fargo reaching out of their mansions and rattling their golden cups in my direction. They instantly put me in the mentality of a consumer [...] weighing up a pre-order against the potential fiction of their oft-broken pre-release promises. [...] It's not wrong because they are taking advantage of people – which may or may not be the case – but because this is absolutely not what Kickstarter is about." PC Gamer expressed similar concern: "one wonders if Molyneux couldn't have handled his own funding". Molyneux responded, saying, "I don't see why I, with my background, should be precluded from [Kickstarter]. I made the choice when I left Microsoft to become a small developer again and to define myself like a small developer defines itself, and that is someone who takes unbelievable risks – foolish risks like releasing Curiosity and doing Kickstarter." Molyneux also said that he invested a lot of his own money into the development studio 22cans.

Additional criticisms were made over the freemium model chosen for the iOS version.
Gamers and Kickstarter supporters have reacted negatively to the broken promises by Molyneux, and demands for refunds or apologies have not been met or addressed.

References

External links

2014 video games
Android (operating system) games
Crowdfunded video games
DeNA
God games
Indie video games
IOS games
Kickstarter-funded video games
Linux games
MacOS games
Video games with Steam Workshop support
Video game controversies
Video games developed in the United Kingdom
Windows games
Early access video games